Bassirou Doumbia (born 12 May 1942) is a Senegalese sprinter. He participated at the 1964 Olympic Games in Tokyo.

References

External links
Sports Reference

1942 births
Living people
Athletes (track and field) at the 1964 Summer Olympics
Senegalese male sprinters
Olympic athletes of Senegal
Place of birth missing (living people)
African Games medalists in athletics (track and field)
African Games gold medalists for Senegal
Athletes (track and field) at the 1965 All-Africa Games
20th-century Senegalese people